NGC 277 is a lenticular galaxy in the constellation Cetus. It was discovered on October 8, 1864 by Heinrich d'Arrest.

References

External links
 

0277
18641008
Cetus (constellation)
Lenticular galaxies
Discoveries by Heinrich Louis d'Arrest
002995